For the 2001–02 season, Carlisle United F.C. competed in Football League Division Three.

Results & fixtures

English Third Division

English League Cup

FA Cup

Football League Trophy

References
 11v11

Carlisle United F.C. seasons
Carlisle United